The Forest King is a fantasy novel by Paul B. Thompson, set in the world of Dragonlance, which is based on the Dungeons & Dragons fantasy role-playing game. The novel chronicles the travels of Balif Thraxenath, Chosen Chief of House Protector, First Warrior of the Great Speaker, following the trial of Vedvedsica.

Plot summary
After the trial of Vedvedsica, General Balif is sent on a mission to ascertain the true danger of a new race of small humanoids infiltrating the eastern borders of Silvanesti.

He travels east with an unlikely group. His two loyal servants, Lofotan and Artyrith, both formidable warriors, and Mathi, and Treskan unsure where their loyalties lie.

Characters
 Balif Thraxenath, Chosen Chief of House Protector, First Warrior of the Great Speaker. General Balif, also known as Camaxilas.
 Uristathan Cavolax also known as Vedvedsica. A wizard charged with creating an abomination.
 Lofotan
 Artyrith, the generals cook, and a warrior in his own right.
 Mathani Arborelinex a ward of Quenesti Pha from the Haven of the Lost.
 Treskan of Woodbec, a scribe.
 Amaranthe
 The Longwalker, the nominal leader of the kender.
 Rufus Wrinkelcap

Other books
The Forest King is part of the Anvil of Time series, which also include:
 The Sellsword (April 2008), by Cam Banks,
 The Survivors (November 2008), by Dan Willis,
 Renegade Wizards (March 2009), by Lucien Soulban,

See also

References

External links

2009 American novels

American fantasy novels
Dragonlance novels